Barnes House may refer to:

in England
Andrew Barnes House, Norham

in the United States
(by state, then city)
Barnes-Peery House, Golden, Colorado, listed on the National Register of Historic Places (NRHP)
Selah Barnes House, Southington, Connecticut, listed on the NRHP in Connecticut
Barnes-Frost House, Southington, Connecticut, NRHP-listed
House at 3764 Ponce de Leon Avenue, Jacksonville, Florida, also known as the Barnes House, NRHP-listed
Tom Barnes Barn, Jerome, Idaho, NRHP-listed
Henry J. Barnes House, Mt. Washington, Kentucky, listed on the NRHP in Kentucky
Spofford-Barnes House, Boxford, Massachusetts, NRHP-listed
James B. Barnes House, Cambridge, Massachusetts, NRHP-listed
Walter S. and Melissa E. Barnes House, Somerville, Massachusetts, NRHP-listed
Barnes House (Quincy, Massachusetts), NRHP-listed
Jonathan Barnes House, Hillsborough Center, New Hampshire, NRHP-listed
Barnes-Hiscock House, Syracuse, New York, NRHP-listed
Gen. Joshua Barnes House, Wilson, North Carolina, listed on the NRHP in North Carolina
Barnes-Hooks Farm, Fremont, North Carolina, listed on the NRHP in North Carolina
David A. Barnes House, Murfreesboro, North Carolina, listed on the NRHP in Hertford County, North Carolina
Barnes-Steverson House, Idabel, Oklahoma, listed on the NRHP in Oklahoma
Frank C. Barnes House, Portland, Oregon, NRHP-listed
W. C. Barnes House, Victoria, Texas, listed on the NRHP in Texas
Charles W. Barnes House, Austin, Texas, listed on the NRHP in Texas
Barnes-Laird House, San Antonio, Texas, Listed on the NRHP in Texas
John George Moroni Barnes House, Kaysville, Utah, NRHP-listed
John R. Barnes House, Kaysville, Utah, NRHP-listed
Charles Barnes House, Park City, Utah, listed on the NRHP in Utah
Andrew Barnes House, Menomonee Falls, Wisconsin, listed on the NRHP in Wisconsin
Barnes-Wellford House, Charleston, West Virginia, NRHP-listed